Count Axel Charles Emil Lewenhaupt (27 May 1917 – 20 November 2018) was a Swedish diplomat and Grand Master of Ceremonies at the Royal Court of Sweden.

Career
Lewenhaupt was born in Helsingborg, Sweden, the son of Colonel, Count Gustaf Lewenhaupt and his wife Baroness Elisabeth Ramel. He passed studentexamen in 1936 and his reserve officer exam in 1938 and received a Candidate of Law degree from Uppsala University in 1942 before becoming an attaché at the Ministry for Foreign Affairs in 1943. Lewenhaupt served as an attaché in Rome in 1943. The Swedish legation's duties during World War II in Rome included taking special measures to protect Swedish interests and Swedish nationals (including Elizabeth Hesselblad) who was still in Rome. The focus was to protect the Swedish Institute and the convent church Santa Brigida. After Rome, Lewenhaupt was attaché in Berlin in 1944 and in Helsinki from 1945 to 1947. He was second secretary at the Foreign Ministry from 1948 to 1952 and first legation secretary in Madrid from 1952 to 1956. Lewenhaupt was first secretary at the Foreign Ministry from 1956 to 1958 and director at the Foreign Ministry from 1958 to 1960.

He was embassy counsellor in Washington, D.C. from 1960 to 1962 and ambassador in Leopoldville from 1962 to 1963. Lewenhaupt was acting head of the political department at the Foreign Ministry from 1964 to 1965 and its administrative department from 1965 to 1967. He was ambassador in Bangkok, Rangoon, Kuala Lumpur and Singapore from 1967 to 1970 and ambassador in New Delhi, Colombo and Katmandu from 1970 to 1975. Lewenhaupt was then ambassador in Belgrade and Tirana from 1975 to 1978 and served at the  Foreign Ministry from 1978 to 1979. He was ambassador in Rome and Valletta from 1979 to 1983 and Grand Master of Ceremonies at the Royal Court of Sweden from 1983 to 1988.

Other work
Lewenhaupt was also secretary of the Foreign Ministry's admissions commission (UD:s antagningskommission) in 1951 and representative at trade negotiations with Spain, Soviet Union and other nations from 1952 to 1958. He became a member of the Royal Automobile Club in 1956 and was the companion of the Duke of Halland at the officer's visit to Ethiopia and Liberia in 1959. Lewenhaupt was representative at the United Nations General Assembly in 1973 and permanent representative at the Food and Agriculture Organization from 1979 to 1983.

Personal life
In 1944, Lewenhaupt married Elsa Rudberg (1918–1990), the daughter of first accountant Ivar Rudberg and Sonja Bergström. He was the father of Anne (1946–2018) and Eva (born 1948). In 1991 he married Countess Louise Ehrensvärd (1925–2014), the daughter of the General, Count Carl August Ehrensvärd and Countess Gisela Bassewitz. He turned 100 in May 2017 and died in November 2018 at the age of 101.

Awards and decorations
Lewenhaupt's awards:
Commander of the Order of Civil Merit
Knight of the Order of the White Rose of Finland
Knight of the Order of the Crown of Italy
Knight of the Order of Merit of the Republic of Hungary
Grand Officer of the Order of the Star of Ethiopia
Commander of the Order of the Crown
Commander of the Order of Merit of the Austrian Republic
Swedish Red Cross badge of merit in silver (Svenska Röda Korsets förtjänsttecken i silver)

Bibliography

References

1917 births
2018 deaths
Ambassadors of Sweden to Albania
Ambassadors of Sweden to India
Ambassadors of Sweden to Italy
Ambassadors of Sweden to Malaysia
Ambassadors of Sweden to Malta
Ambassadors of Sweden to Myanmar
Ambassadors of Sweden to Nepal
Ambassadors of Sweden to Singapore
Ambassadors of Sweden to Sri Lanka
Ambassadors of Sweden to Thailand
Ambassadors of Sweden to the Democratic Republic of the Congo
Ambassadors of Sweden to Yugoslavia
Men centenarians
People from Helsingborg
Swedish centenarians
Swedish counts
Uppsala University alumni
Recipients of orders, decorations, and medals of Ethiopia